Llanishen is the name of an electoral ward in the north of Cardiff, capital city of Wales. It covers the community of Llanishen (and until 2022 Thornhill, which was created  from the northern half of Llanishen in 2016).

Llanishen is bordered to the north by the Lisvane and Thornhill ward, to the west by Rhiwbina, to the south by the Heath ward and to the southeast by Cyncoed.

The Llanishen ward elects two (formerly four) councillors to Cardiff Council and has been represented by a mixture of Conservative and Labour councillors.

Between 2014 and 2017 Llanishen councillor Phil Bale was the leader of Cardiff Council. On 2 August 2019 Phil Bale announced he was stepping down as councillor triggering a by-election on 21 November 2019. Labour subsequently lost its seat to the Conservative Party.

2020 boundary review
Following a Cardiff boundary review, intended to give better electoral parity, the new community of Thornhill was transferred from the Llanishen ward to the neighbouring Lisvane ward, effective from the 2022 Cardiff Council election. As a result, Llanishen's representation reduced from 4 to 2 councillors.

Representation

BE = overall standing in the ward following a by-election

One of the four Conservative councillors who had represented the ward since 2004, Bob Smith, resigned from the Conservative party in November 2011, to sit as an Independent. This was in protest at not being re-selected to fight the seat at the May 2012 elections.

Cardiff Council elections

2017

2019 by-election
A by-election took place on 21 November 2019, caused by the resignation of the remaining Labour councillor, Phil Bale. The seat was won by the Conservatives.

* = sitting councillor prior to the election

References

Cardiff electoral wards
Llanishen, Cardiff